Spring Meeting is a 1941 British comedy film directed by Walter C. Mycroft and Norman Lee and starring Enid Stamp-Taylor, Michael Wilding, Basil Sydney and Sarah Churchill. It was based on a 1938 play of the same title by M. J. Farrell and John Perry. It was shot at Welwyn Studios. In 1942 it was given an American release, distributed by Monogram Pictures, and renamed, 'Three Wise Brides'.

Premise
Instead of marrying Joan, a woman considered perfect by his parents, Tony falls for her little sister, Baby.

Cast
 Enid Stamp-Taylor as Tiny Fox-Collier
 Michael Wilding as Tony Fox-Collier
 Basil Sydney as James
 Sarah Churchill as Joan Furze
 Nova Pilbeam as Baby Furze
 W.G. Fay as Johnny
 Margaret Rutherford as Aunt Bijou
 Henry Edwards as Sir Richard Furze
 Hugh McDermott as Michael Byrne

References

Bibliography
 Goble, Alan. The Complete Index to Literary Sources in Film. Walter de Gruyter, 1999.

External links

1941 films
1941 comedy films
British comedy films
1940s English-language films
Films directed by Norman Lee
British black-and-white films
Films shot at Welwyn Studios
British films based on plays
Films set in Ireland
1940s British films